Stilobezzia is a genus of predaceous midges in the family Ceratopogonidae. There are more than 330 described species in Stilobezzia.

See also
 List of Stilobezzia species

References

Further reading

External links

 

Ceratopogonidae
Articles created by Qbugbot
Chironomoidea genera